Persoonia hirsuta, commonly known as the hairy geebung or hairy persoonia, is a plant in the family Proteaceae and is endemic to eastern New South Wales.

Description
Flowering mostly occurs from November to January and the fruit is a fleshy green to cream-coloured drupe with red streaks.

Taxonomy and naming
Collected by John White in the vicinity of Port Jackson (Sydney) in 1794, Persoonia hirsuta was first formally described by Christiaan Hendrik Persoon in his 1805 work Synopsis Plantarum.

In 1991, Peter Weston and Lawrie Johnson described two subspecies and the names are accepted by the Australian Plant Census:

Distribution and habitat
Hairy geebung usually grows in open woodland and heath on sandstone soils.

Ecology
The two subspecies intergrade with each other from the lower Blue Mountains to within  of the coast. Subspecies evoluta also hybridises with P. mollis subsp. nectens. The fruit are adapted to be eaten by vertebrates, such as kangaroos, possums, and currawongs and other large birds.

Conservation status
Persoonia hirsuta is listed nationally as endangered under the Environment Protection and Biodiversity Conservation Act 1999 and in New South Wales under the Biodiversity Conservation Act 2016. The species occurs in fragmented small populations throughout its range and is threatened by urban development, clearing or degradation of bushland and too frequent bushfires and burning of bush. The European honeybee has been implicated in the decline of this and other species as it is suspected of being a poor pollinator of persoonia flowers.

References

hirsuta
Flora of New South Wales
Plants described in 1805
Taxa named by Christiaan Hendrik Persoon